Hon. Francis Jeffrey Moncreiff (27 August 1849 – 30 May 1900) was a Scottish rugby union player, and 's first captain, making him one of the first two captains in international rugby.

Personal history
Moncrieff was born in 1849, the second son of James Moncreiff, 1st Baron Moncreiff of Tulliebole. He attended Edinburgh Academy. On 29 October 1880 he married Mildred Fitzherbert, daughter of Lt Colonel Richard Henry Fitzherbert.

Rugby career
On 27 March 1871, Moncreiff was selected to represent Scotland in the first international rugby union game and to captain the team. He played club rugby for Edinburgh Academicals.

Notes

References
 Bath, Richard (ed.) The Scotland Rugby Miscellany (Vision Sports Publishing Ltd, 2007 )

1849 births
1900 deaths
Scottish rugby union players
Scotland international rugby union players
People educated at Edinburgh Academy
History of rugby union in Scotland
Edinburgh District (rugby union) players
Rugby union forwards